Chegon is a rural locality (a selo) in Stepnoy Selsoviet, Soloneshensky District, Altai Krai, Russia. The population was 35 as of 2013.

Geography
Stepnoye is the nearest rural locality.

References

rural localities in Soloneshensky District